Kwon Yong-Nam  (born 2 December 1985) is a South Korean footballer who plays as a defender and midfielder for Gwangju FC in the K League Challenge.

External links 
 

1985 births
Living people
Association football midfielders
Association football defenders
South Korean footballers
Jeju United FC players
Gwangju FC players
K League 1 players
Korea National League players
Dankook University alumni